David Russell Humphreys is an American physicist who advocates for young Earth creationism. He holds a PhD in physics and has proposed a theory for the origin of the universe which allegedly resolves the distant starlight problem that exists in young Earth creationism.

Education and affiliations
Humphreys graduated with a B.S. from Duke University and was awarded his Ph.D in physics from Louisiana State University in 1972. He has worked for General Electric and Sandia National Laboratories where he received a patent and a science award. From 2001 to 2008, he was an associate professor at The Institute for Creation Research. He currently works for Creation Ministries International (USA). Humphreys is a board member of both the Creation Research Society and the Creation Science Fellowship of New Mexico.

Planetary magnetism
In an article published in the Creation Research Society Quarterly in December 1984, Humphreys proposed a creationist model for the origin of planetary magnetic fields. According to the model, the planets were initially created as spheres of water, with the polar magnetic moments of the water molecules largely aligned. Lenz's law predicts that the resulting magnetic field would decay exponentially, and Humphreys fits an exponential decay model to recent observations of the Earth's magnetism to conclude that the magnetic field is 6000 years old. As part of his model, he also made predictions about the magnetic fields of Mercury, Mars, Uranus, Neptune and Pluto by using assumed values for their initial magnetic field and decay rates.

In 1990 Humphreys published a follow up to his predictions as Voyager 2 had now measured Uranus and Neptune's magnetic fields. In an article, Humphreys claimed that his model had an easier time explaining their magnetic fields than the dynamo theory.

According to Humphreys, his model's predictions were again verified when probes in 2008 and 2011 flew past Mercury and measured the magnetic field. Humphreys claimed that the observed decay of Mercury's magnetic field was in line with that predicted by his model.

Cosmology
Humphreys' book Starlight and Time presents his alternative to the Big Bang in an attempt to solve what young Earth creationists call the Distant Starlight Problem. Its thesis is that the Earth and universe are about six thousand years old when measured in Earth's reference frame, whereas the outer edge of an expanding and rotating 3-dimensional universe is billions of years old (as measured from its reference frame). It proposes, using the principles of relativity, to postulate that time ticked at different rates during the universe's origin. In other words, according to his theory, clocks on Earth registered the six days of creation, while those at the edge of the universe counted the approximately 15 billion years needed for light from the most distant galaxies to reach Earth. The model places the Milky Way galaxy relatively near the center of the cosmos.

Humphreys' proposal has been criticized by other scientists and old Earth creationists, such as Hugh Ross and Samuel R. Conner. Humphreys has replied to Ross' and Conner's critiques.

In 1998, physicist Dave Thomas wrote that in Humphreys' thousands-of-years-old universe, he "has his astronomy backwards - the Kuiper Belt contains the remains of the 'volatile' (icy) planetesimals that were left over from the formation of the Solar System - numbering in the hundreds of millions. If anything, it is the Kuiper Belt that supplies the more remote hypothesized Oort Cloud, as some icy chunks are occasionally flung far away by interactions with large planets."

Thomas also criticised Humphreys' idea that there is "not enough sodium in the sea" for a several billion year old sea, writing, "Humphreys finds estimates of oceanic salt accumulation and deposition that provide him the data to 'set' an upper limit of 62 million years. But modern geologists do not use erratic processes like these for clocks. It's like someone noticing that (A) it's snowing at an inch per hour, (B) the snow outside is four feet deep, and then concluding that (C) the Earth is just 48 hours, or two days, in age. Snowfall is erratic; some snow can melt; and so on. The Earth is older than two days, so there must be a flaw with the 'snow' dating method, just as there is with the 'salt' method."

Other criticisms are by Don Page, C. McIntosh (an expert on exact solutions to Einstein's field equations), and John Hartnett. These sources are cited approvingly by astrophysicists L. Barnes and G. Lewis in their book The cosmic revolutionary's handbook. They also stress analysing the idea, not attacking the person.

New Cosmology
In 2008 Humphreys published a new but lesser-known cosmological proposal.  In it he seeks to challenge a foundational dogma of general relativity and postulates an additional spacetime dimension, one which grants God ample liberty to hold the Earth in a “timeless” region of suspended animation while the rest of the universe ages for billions of years, thus allowing very old and distant starlight to bathe a young Earth on creation day four. A critic pointed out that the well-known equation for gravitational redshift/blueshift countermands his model's efforts to achieve today's observed redshift from cosmic sources, to which Humphreys countered by terming the gravitational redshift equation a “flawed equation” and became dismissive in his remarks about any potential applicability to his model. Since his new cosmology relies heavily on the observed sunward acceleration of the Pioneer spacecraft as a manifestation peculiar to features of his model, his ideas were dealt a significant blow when researchers from the Jet Propulsion Laboratory in California discovered that the apparent anomaly was due to the thermal recoil force acting on the spacecraft.

Helium Problems
Geologist Kevin Henke has criticised Humphreys for stating that "zircons from the Fenton Hill rock cores... contain too much radiogenic helium to be billions of years old." Henke wrote that the equations in Humphreys' work "are based on many false assumptions (isotropic diffusion, constant temperatures over time, etc.) and the vast majority of Humphreys et al.'''s critical a, b, and Q/Q0 values that are used in these 'dating' equations are either missing, poorly defined, improperly measured or inaccurate." Humphreys has replied to Henke's criticisms.Helium Evidence for a Young World Overcomes Pressure, D. Russell Humphreys Henke subsequently refuted the response.

Earth Cooling Model
Scientists Glenn Morton and George L Murphy have dismissed Humphreys' idea that the Earth is cooling as "wrong" because "it is ineffective, it is falsified by observational data, and it is theologically flawed."
 Firstly, in a classical model for a harmonic oscillator (like a particle oscillating in a crystal), "the particle does not lose energy to the cosmic expansion."
 Secondly, Humphreys' model "is too slow to be useful to the creationist agenda."
 Thirdly, "there would be visible effects in the spectra of light emitted during the Flood, including those from stars a few thousand light years away in our own galaxy. A change in the energy levels of atoms (which this idea would entail) would change the frequencies at which light is emitted in a fashion that would be observable. The lack of such observations rules out Humphreys' cooling mechanism as a reasonable possibility."
 Lastly, they criticized it for contradicting the theological foundation that Humphreys uses in another publication.

See also
John Hartnett (physicist)

BibliographyStarlight and Time: Solving the Puzzle of Distant Starlight in a Young Universe'' (Green Forest, AR: Master Books) 1994.

References

American Christian writers
American Christian Young Earth creationists
Duke University alumni
American people of Welsh descent
1942 births
Living people
People from Wyandotte, Michigan
Louisiana State University alumni
Baptist writers